Fernette Peak is a peak,  high, that rises above the south-central part of Roberts Massif in the Queen Maud Mountains of Antarctica. It was mapped by the United States Geological Survey from surveys and U.S. Navy air photos, 1960–65, and was named by the Advisory Committee on Antarctic Names for Gregory L. Fernette, a United States Antarctic Research Program field assistant in Antarctica during the 1968–69 season.

References 

Mountains of the Ross Dependency
Dufek Coast